Cristian Domínguez Barrios (born 27 August 1982), simply known as Cristian, is a Spanish futsal player who plays as a goalkeeper.

Honours

Club
Caja Segovia
Intercontinental Futsal Cup: 2000

Barcelona
Primera División: 2010–11, 2011–12, 2012–13
Copa de España: 2011, 2012, 2013
Supercopa de España: 2000
Copa del Rey: 2010–11, 2011–12, 2012–13, 2013–14
UEFA Futsal Cup: 2011–12, 2013–14

Benfica
Supertaça de Portugal: 2016

International
Spain
UEFA Futsal Championship: 2007, 2010, 2012
FIFA Futsal World Cup: Runner-up 2008, 2012

Other
Spanish Championship of Territorial Teams: 1998, 2000

Individual
LNFS Best Goalkeeper: 2010–11
LNFS Revelation Player: 2002–03

References

External links
Benfica official profile 
RFEF profile (archived) 
UEFA profile

1982 births
Living people
Sportspeople from Madrid
Spanish men's futsal players
Futsal goalkeepers
FS Cartagena players
FC Barcelona Futsal players
S.L. Benfica futsal players
Spanish expatriate sportspeople in Portugal